Teracolini is a tribe of pierid butterflies in the subfamily Pierinae.

References

 
Pierinae
Butterfly tribes